Leilani Farha is a Canadian lawyer who is the Global Director of THE SHIFT, a housing initiative. Between June 2014 and April 2020, she was the United Nations special rapporteur on adequate housing.

Career
Farha is legally trained  and an alumna of the University of Toronto, and has been an Executive Director of the Centre for Equality Rights in Accommodation (CERA) and Canada Without Poverty.

United Nations special rapporteur on housing
In her tenure as Special Rapporteur, she has focused on economic inequality and an absence of effective political representation for the poor as causes of homelessness or inadequate accommodation. Farha campaigns for the right to adequate housing for marginalized groups, she worked in Canada to implement United Nations resolutions that see homelessness as a violation of human rights. Farha has taken part in missions worldwide to examine the condition of housing rights and to develop policies to implement those rights.

Views
Leilani Farha told The Guardian about the Grenfell Tower fire. Farha fears tenants' human rights were breached because they were not sufficiently involved in the way the building was developed, notably safety issues, before the fire and are not sufficiently involved in the investigations after the fire. Farha stated, "I’m concerned when I have residents saying to me they feel they are not being heard and that they are not always being treated like human beings. Those are the fundamentals of human rights: voice, dignity, and participation in solutions to their own situations." Lack of safety over cladding used, over electrical circuits and access to the building for fire and rescue vehicles could have breached human rights to safe and secure housing, Farha stated.

THE SHIFT

Leilani Farha was a pioneer in launching THE SHIFT in 2019 as a new global movement to claim and realize the basic human right to housing; SHIFT encourages individuals and businesses to consider housing not exclusively as a place to invest excess capital, but to consider providing housing facilities as a place for people to live with dignity, raise families and participate more actively in the community. After leaving her position as UN Special Rapporteur, she became the Global Director of The Shift organization.

SHIFT pursues its goals with the partnership of the UN High Commissioner for Human Rights and United Cities Local Government.

References

Related Articles 
 Human rights defender
 International human rights law
 Office of the United Nations High Commissioner for Human Rights
 United Nations Human Rights Committee

External links
Make the Shift official website
Procedures of the Human Rights Council

Year of birth missing (living people)
Living people
University of Toronto alumni
United Nations special rapporteurs
Canadian officials of the United Nations